The Sangai Express is an Indian English Daily newspaper based in Imphal with the circulation of 27,513 copies. It is the highest circulated newspaper in Manipuri Language.

References 

Asian news websites
English-language newspapers published in India